Bullying in the medical profession is common, particularly of student or trainee physicians. It is thought that this is at least in part an outcome of conservative traditional hierarchical structures and teaching methods in the medical profession which may result in a bullying cycle.

According to Field, bullies are attracted to the caring professions, such as medicine, by the opportunities to exercise power over vulnerable clients, employees and students.

While the stereotype of a victim as a weak person who somehow deserves to be bullied is salient, there is growing evidence that bullies, who are often driven by jealousy and envy, pick on the highest performing and most skilled students, whose mere presence is sufficient to make the bully feel insecure. The victim are usually high academic achievers and are likely to have been top of the class throughout their school years. As medical students have to compete against each other, this can make certain trainee doctors eager to stand out from the crowd, and some use underhand techniques to gain academic recognition.

The rampant problem of medical student mistreatment and bullying was systematically studied and reported in a 1990 JAMA study by pediatrician Henry K. Silver which found that 46.4 percent of students at one medical school had been abused at some point during medical school; by the time they were seniors, that number was 80.6 percent.

In a 2002 test, 594 BMA members were randomly selected to complete a bullying survey, and 220 of the 594 junior doctors reported having been bullied in the previous year. This survey reported no variance in job grade or age.

Psychology
Threats (of exposure of inadequacy) must be ruthlessly controlled and subjugated. Psychological models such as transference and projection have been proposed to explain such behaviors, wherein the bully's sense of personal inadequacy is projected or transferred to a victim; through making others feel inadequate and subordinate, the bully thus vindicates their own sense of inferiority.

Displacement is another defense mechanism that can explain the propensity of many medical educators to bully students, and may operate subconsciously. Displacement entails the redirection of an impulse (usually aggression) onto a powerless substitute target. The target can be a person or an object that can serve as a symbolic substitute. Displacement can operate in chain-reactions, wherein people unwittingly become at once victims and perpetrators of displacement. For example, a resident physician may be undergoing stress with her patients or at home, but cannot express these feelings toward patients or toward her family members, so she channels these negative emotions toward vulnerable students in the form of intimidation, control or subjugation. The student then acts brashly toward a patient, channeling reactive emotions which cannot be directed back to the resident physician onto more vulnerable subjects.

Beyond its ramifications for victims, disrespect and bullying in medicine is a threat to patient safety because it inhibits collegiality and cooperation essential to teamwork, cuts off communication, undermines morale, and inhibits compliance with and implementation of new practices.

Bullying cycle
Medical training usually takes place in institutions that have a highly structured hierarchical system, and has traditionally involved teaching by intimidation and humiliation. Such practices may foster a culture of bullying and the setting up of a cycle of bullying, analogous to other cycles of abuse in which those who experience it go on to abuse others when they become more senior. Medical doctors are increasingly reporting to the British Medical Association that they are being bullied, often by older and more senior colleagues, many of whom were badly treated themselves when more junior.

Physician Jonathan Belsey relates in an emblematic narrative published in AMA Virtual Mentor entitled Teaching By Humiliation that "however well you presented the case, somewhere along the line you would trip up and give the predatory professor his opportunity to expose your inadequacies. Sometimes it would be your lack of medical knowledge; sometimes the question that you failed to ask the patient that would have revealed the root of the problem, or sometimes your ineptitude at eliciting the required clinical signs. On one memorable occasion, when I had appeared to cover all the bases clinically, the professor turned to me and berated me for attending his ward round wearing a plaid shirt that was clearly inappropriate for an aspiring doctor."

Impact
Bullying can significantly decrease job satisfaction and increase job-induced stress; it also leads to low self-confidence, depression, anxiety and a desire to leave employment. Bullying contributes to high rates of staff turnover, high rates of sickness absence, impaired performance, lower productivity, poor team spirit and loss of trained staff. This has implications for the recruitment and retention of medical staff.

Chronic and current bullying are associated with substantially worse health, according to research by Laura M. Bogart, associate professor of pediatrics at Harvard Medical School.

Studies have consistently shown that physicians have had the highest depression and suicide rates compared to people in many other lines of work—for suicide, 40% higher for male physicians and 130% higher for female physicians. Research has traced the beginning of this difference to the years spent in medical school. Students enter medical school with mental health profiles similar to those of their peers but end up experiencing depression, burnout, suicidal ideation and other mental illnesses at much higher rates. Despite better access to health care, they are more likely to cope by resorting to dysfunctional and self-injurious behaviors, and are less likely to receive the right care or even recognize that they need some kind of intervention.

Exposure to bullying and intimidation during formative years of medical training has been found to contribute to these consequences. Fear of stigmatisation among medical students was the subject of a study in JAMA by Thomas Schwenk and colleagues at the University of Michigan's Department of Family Medicine, USA. 53% of medical students who reported high levels of depressive symptoms were worried that revealing their illness would be risky for their careers and 62% said asking for help would mean their coping skills were inadequate, according to the study published in September 2010. "Medical students are under extraordinary demands. They feel they are making life and death decisions and that they can never be wrong. There is such tremendous pressure to be perfect that any sense of falling short makes them very anxious", says Schwenk.

Types

Medical students

Medical students, perhaps being vulnerable because of their relatively low status in health care settings, may experience verbal abuse, humiliation and harassment (nonsexual or sexual). Discrimination based on gender and race are less common.

In one study, around 35% of medical students reported having been bullied. Around one in four of the 1,000 students questioned said they had been bullied by a medical doctor. Furthermore, bullying has been known to occur among medical students. Manifestations of bullying include:
 being humiliated by teachers in front of patients or peers
 been victimised for not having come from a "medical family" (often people who enter medicine have an older sibling pursuing the same degree or share ties with other individuals in the profession with whom familial relationship confers some degree of protection or special influence – especially within academic settings.) Such practices extend to admissions procedures, which are regularly influenced by factors far afield of candidates' intrinsic merits, such as being related to faculty members or well-known medical luminaries.
 being put under pressure to carry out a procedure without supervision.
 being ostracized by other medical students for asking questions (due to the medical content being confusing for some students) through social media networks (Facebook bullying), phone, or in person.

One study showed that the medical faculty was the faculty in which students were most commonly mistreated.

Bullying extends to postgraduate students.

Junior (trainee) physicians
In a UK study, 37% of junior doctors reported being bullied in the previous year and 84% had experienced at least one bullying incident. Black and Asian physicians were more likely to be bullied than other physicians. Women were more likely to be bullied than men.

Trainee physicians who feel threatened in the clinical workplace develop less effectively and are less likely to ask for advice or help when they need it. Persistent destructive criticism, sarcastic comments and humiliation in front of colleagues will cause all but the most resilient of trainees to lose confidence in themselves.

Consultants who feel burnt out and alienated may take their disaffection out on junior colleagues.

The farewell interview from Sir Ian Kennedy (Chair of the Healthcare Commission) caused significant media interest following his statement that bullying is a 'corrosive' problem that the NHS must address.

Psychiatry
Psychiatric trainees experience rates of bullying at least as high as other medical students. In a survey of psychiatric trainees in the West Midlands, 47% had experienced bullying within the last year with even higher percentages amongst ethnic minorities and females. Qualified psychiatrists are not themselves required to be psychiatrically assessed.

Nursing

Nurses experience bullying quite frequently. It is thought that relational aggression (psychological aspects of bullying such as gossiping and intimidation) are commonplace. Relational aggression has been studied among girls but not so much among adult women.

Speaking of many doctors' predilection for bullying nurses, Theresa Brown writes:

Popular culture
Sir Lancelot Spratt, a character played by actor James Robertson Justice in the film series Doctor in the House, is often referenced as the archetypal arrogant bullying doctor ruling by fear. The film series also demonstrates bullying of student doctors by other doctors and the nursing matron.

In the American sitcom Scrubs, Dr. Cox uses intimidation and sarcasm as methods of tormenting the interns and expressing his dislike towards them and their company.

See also

 Aggression in healthcare
 Disruptive physician
 Doctor-patient relationship
 Burnout and depression of medical students
 Medical education
 Medical narcissism
 Medical school
 Sham peer review
 Stafford Hospital scandal
 Stress in medical students
 Whistleblowing
 Workplace safety in healthcare settings

References

Further reading

 Mistry M and Latoo J Bullying: a growing workplace menace BJMP Mar 2009 Volume 2 Number 1

 Vanderstar ES Workplace Bullying in the Healthcare Professions 2004 8 Employee Rights and Employment Policy Journal 455
Wible, Pamela (2019). Human Rights Violations in Medicine: A-to-Z Action Guide. 

 Wood, DF. Bullying in medical schools Student BMJ October 2006

External links 
 Bullying and harassment at British Medical Association
 WMA statement on bullying and harassment within the profession at World Medical Association

Medical ethics
Social problems in medicine
Workplace bullying